Looking Back is a studio album by the British singer Toyah Willcox, released in 1995. It is a collection of re-recordings of songs from her back catalogue, mostly classic hits from the Toyah band repertoire. The material was originally conceived as part of a double album Toyah Classics slated for release in March 1995. The two sets would eventually be released individually, with Looking Back as an 'electric' accompaniment to The Acoustic Album, released the following year. The album has never been re-released digitally.

Track listing
 "I Wanna Be Free" (Toyah Willcox, Joel Bogen) – 2:53
 "Obsolete" (Willcox, Bogen, Nigel Glockler) – 2:56
 "It's a Mystery" (Keith Hale) – 3:58
 "We Are" (Willcox, Bogen) – 3:03
 "Thunder in the Mountains" (Willcox, Adrian Lee, Nigel Glockler) – 4:16
 "Good Morning Universe" (Willcox, Bogen) – 3:46
 "Angel & Me" (Willcox, Bogen) – 3:22
 "Be Proud, Be Loud (Be Heard)" (Willcox, Bogen) – 3:22
 "Danced" (Willcox, Bogen, Peter Bush) – 5:09
 "Rebel Run" (Willcox, Simon Darlow) – 3:14
 "Desire" (Willcox, Robert Fripp) – 2:34
 "Ieya" (Willcox, Bogen, Bush) – 6:11

Personnel
 Toyah Willcox – vocals
 Tony 'Pooh' Kelly – guitars
 David Waddington – guitar
 Andy Nye – keyboards
 Bob Skeat – bass, acoustic bass
 Andy Dewar – drums, percussion
 Tacye Lynette – additional vocals

Production
 Oliver Davis – producer
 Paul Maddens – engineer
 David Richardson – executive producer

References

External links
 The official Toyah website

1995 albums
Toyah Willcox albums